Avlonas is a village and a former municipality in Messenia, Peloponnese, Greece. Since the 2011 local government reform it is part of the municipality Trifylia, of which it is a municipal unit. The municipal unit has an area of 112.898 km2. Population 1,922 (2011). The seat of the municipality was in Sidirokastro.

References

Populated places in Messenia